Hilder Jobany Colón Alvarez is a Honduran professional footballer. He represented Honduras in the football competition at the 2012 Summer Olympics.

References

External links
 

1989 births
Living people
Footballers at the 2012 Summer Olympics
Olympic footballers of Honduras
Honduran footballers
Association football defenders
Real C.D. España players
C.D. Victoria players
C.D. Real Sociedad players
Juticalpa F.C. players
C.D. Honduras Progreso players